Mount Bishop is a mountain in the Camelsfoot Range in the Lillooet Country of the Central Interior of British Columbia.  Named for an old settler, it is located four km north of the settlement of Moha, which is at the confluence of the Bridge and Yalakom Rivers.

References

Bishop
Lillooet Country